Seasons of My Soul is the debut studio album by British singer-songwriter Rumer. It was released on 1 November 2010. The album peaked to number 3 on the UK Albums Chart, it also charted in 11 countries including Australia, New Zealand, France, Sweden and Switzerland.

Singles
 "Slow" was the first single released from the album, it featured on Smooth FM, and on BBC Radio 2 as a record of the week. It peaked to #16 on the UK Singles Chart and #33 on the Irish Singles Chart.
 "Aretha" was the second single, released on 24 October 2010. It peaked at #72 on the UK Singles Chart.

Background
In an Interview with Robert Copsey of Digital Spy she explained why the album was called "Seasons of My Soul", she said: "Mainly because it took me so long to make the album that I noticed that the songs were coming round again. I'd have these moods in my soul that would come around like seasons over the years and the songs matched the moods. It was like an emotional landscape. There are different shades, different feels and different colours to the album. Some people have been saying that 'Slow' is an autumnal song and so is 'Aretha' in a way."

Meanwhile, in terms of its musical and lyrical influences, Rumer told Pete Lewis, Assistant Editor of Blues & Soul: "I think all the songs have elements of different things that have influenced me, and different MUSIC that's influenced me. Songs like 'Slow' and 'Come To Me High' have little dreamy, Bacharach-type chords and those lilting, gorgeous melodies that remind me of songs that I've heard and loved in films that were written by the fantastic composers from the Thirties like Irving Berlin and Rodgers & Hammerstein. Then 'Take Me As I Am' is very Laura Nyro & LaBelle - soulful with a gospel feel. ("When we did Take Me As I Am, we were listening to the Laura Nyro/Labelle album Gonna Take a Miracle. That was a huge influence on the record. New York Tendaberry as well." ) While 'Thankful' I think is very Joni Mitchell from her Hejira phase, where it's like a poem which describes a season in each verse... While lyrically the album is largely just classic autobiographical storytelling." Other influences on the album Rumer has cited are Judee Sill and, " Not necessarily in the songwriting, but in the production", Stephen Bishop.

Track listing
Standard Edition

Chart and certifications

Weekly charts

Year-end charts

Certifications

Release history

References

2010 debut albums
Rumer (musician) albums
Atlantic Records albums